RTL Living is a German pay television channel operated by the RTL Group, launched on 27 November 2006. Its programming consists of television shows about trends, lifestyle, life and travel. On October 1, 2015, RTL Group announced that it was relaunching and redesigning its three payTV channels RTL Living, RTL Crime and Passion (then RTL Passion) as of November 12, 2015. At the same time, new channel logos will also be introduced for these channels.

As part of Mediengruppe RTL Deutschland’s rebranding effort, RTL Living was rebranded along with RTL Passion and the parent channel RTL on 15th September 2021, by becoming a multi-colourful logo instead of green, pink and the three colours: red, yellow and blue from the parent channel.

Logos

Audience share

Germany

References

External links
  

RTL Group
Television stations in Germany
Television channels and stations established in 2006